Gonzalo Omar Basile (born March 30, 1974) is an Argentine professional boxer and truck driver who befriended the syndicalist Hugo Moyano, who is sponsoring his boxing career in the Heavyweight division. As of July 2013, Gonzalo was the WBC Latino Heavyweight Champion.

On April 20, 2019, Basile added the South American Heavyweight title by knocking out Julio Enrique Cuellar Cabrera of Bolivia, who was 13-6 coming into their rematch fight, in the third round at Luis Guillon, Argentina.

Professional career 

On October 28, 2006, Gonzalo fought against Alexander Dimitrenko for the WBO Inter-Continental Heavyweight title and lost in a first-round knockout.
Basile vs Fres Oquendo was set for June 26, 2009 in Chicago. In the end, the fight did not happen. Promoter Dominic Pesoli said, "There’s just too many complications bringing Basile in from Argentina".
On June 6, 2012 Gonzalo had the chance to fight for the Vacant WBC Baltic Silver heavyweight title against Artur Szpilka, but "El Paton" was no opponent for Artur, and he lost by KO on the 4 round.

On February 27, 2021, Basile won the little regarded, Universal Boxing Organization's International (not world) Heavyweight title, which was vacant previously, by knocking out Gilberto Matheus Domingos, who was 22-12 in 34 previous contests, in round one of a scheduled ten rounds fight, at the Coliseu Boxe Centre in Guarulhos, Sao Paulo, Brazil. With that win, he also earned the little regarded American Boxing Federation American west Heavyweight title, which was also vacant. This fight was a rematch; Basile had recently before beaten Domingos by second-round knockout in Argentina.

Professional record

Professional boxing record

References

External links 

Boxers from Buenos Aires
Sportspeople from La Plata
People from Buenos Aires Province
Middleweight boxers
Light-middleweight boxers
Welterweight boxers
1974 births
Living people
Argentine male boxers
Argentine sportspeople of Italian descent